BTS is a South Korean boy band. 

BTS may also refer to:

Arts and media
 BTS, a nickname for Beyond the Supernatural, a roleplaying game
 BTS, an abbreviation for Between the Species, a philosophy journal
 BTS, an abbreviation for Beneath the Sky, an American metalcore band
 BTS, an abbreviation for Built to Spill, an American indie rock band
 Behind-the-scenes, a type of documentary film about the production of the film or TV series

Songs
 "BTS" (song), by Wiz Khalifa from the album Khalifa

Organizations
 BTS Group, a global consulting firm headquartered in Stockholm, Sweden
 BTS Group Holdings, a public company in Thailand
 Baptist Theological Seminary, in Kakinada, India
 Biomedical Tissue Services, a defunct human tissue recovery firm
 Breaking the Silence (non-governmental organization), established in 2004 by veterans of the Israel Defense Forces 
 British Thoracic Society, a charity for respiratory and associated disorders
 British Toxicology Society, headquartered in Staffordshire
 British Transplant Society,  a non-profit professional body related to organ transplantation in the United Kingdom
 British Tunnelling Society, a learned society of the Institution of Civil Engineers
 Broadcast Television Systems Inc., a video equipment company
 Bureau of Transportation Statistics, part of the United States Department of Transportation

Technology
 Base transceiver station, a telecommunication base station
 Build to stock, a build-ahead production approach
 Branch Trace Store, of Intel processors

Transportation
 Bandar Tasik Selatan station, a rail interchange station in Kuala Lumpur
 BTS Skytrain, elevated rapid transit system in Bangkok
 Bratislava Airport (IATA code BTS), Slovakia
 Basta railway station (station code BTS)

Education
 Berlin Graduate School for Transnational Studies, a scientific cooperative project between the Free University Berlin, the Hertie School of Governance, and the Social Science Research Center Berlin
 Brevet de technicien supérieur, a technician certificate diploma in France

Others
 Berjaya Times Square, a shopping mall, hotel, condominium, and indoor amusement park complex in Kuala Lumpur, Malaysia

See also
 
 Behind the Scenes (disambiguation)
 Batak Simalungun language (ISO code: bts)
 WBTS (disambiguation)